The Mixed duet free routine competition at the 2019 World Aquatics Championships was held on 19 and 20 July 2019.

Results
The preliminary round was started on 19 July at 11:00. The final was started on 20 July at 17:00.

Green denotes finalists

References

Mixed duet free routine
World Aquatics Championships